Peter Anderson Fairbanks (born December 16, 1993) is an American professional baseball pitcher for the Tampa Bay Rays of Major League Baseball (MLB). Fairbanks was drafted by the Texas Rangers in the ninth round of the 2015 MLB draft. He debuted in MLB for the Rangers in 2019.

Amateur career 
Fairbanks attended Webster Groves High School in Webster Groves, Missouri. He underwent Tommy John surgery during his junior year of high school. Fairbanks attended the University of Missouri and played college baseball for the Tigers from 2013 through 2015. At Missouri, he pitched for the Hyannis Harbor Hawks of the Cape Cod Baseball League in the summers of 2013 and 2014.

Professional career

Texas Rangers
Fairbanks was drafted by the Texas Rangers in the ninth round, with the 258th overall selection, of the 2015 MLB draft. He spent his debut season of 2015 with the Spokane Indians of the Class A Short Season Northwest League, going 1–2 with a 3.14 ERA over 57 innings. He spent the 2016 season with the Hickory Crawdads of the Class A South Atlantic League, going 4–5 with a 4.88 ERA in 101 innings. He opened the 2017 season with the Down East Wood Ducks of the Class A-Advanced Carolina League, going 2–1 with a 5.79 ERA in 18.2 innings. Fairbanks suffered a second torn UCL and underwent Tommy John surgery a second time during the 2017 season. The injury caused him to miss the rest of the 2017 and the entire 2018 season. Fairbanks returned to action in 2019 as a relief pitcher, being assigned to Down East to open the season. He went 1–0 with a 2.92 ERA with 15 strikeouts in 12 innings for them. On May 9, he was promoted to the Frisco RoughRiders of the Texas League. He went 1–0 with a 0.00 ERA and 14 strikeouts in 7 innings for them. On May 29, he was promoted to the Nashville Sounds of the Triple-A Pacific Coast League.

On June 8, Fairbanks's contract was selected and he was promoted to the major leagues for the first time. He made his major league debut on June 9, recording three strikeouts over two scoreless innings of relief.

Tampa Bay Rays
On June 29, 2019, Fairbanks pitched against the Tampa Bay Rays at Tropicana Field and caught the attention of the Rays' front office. On July 13, 2019, he was traded to the Rays for Nick Solak. After the trade, he was assigned to the Durham Bulls. Fairbanks finished the 2019 season going 2–3 with a 6.86 ERA over 21 MLB innings.  

In 2020, Fairbanks threw in 27 games of the 60-game season. He posted an ERA of 2.70, recording 39 strikeouts in 26.2 innings. In Game 7 of the Championship Series against the Houston Astros, Fairbanks recorded a 4-out save as the Rays won the American League pennant. Fairbanks made 47 appearances in 2021, pitching to a 3.59 ERA with 56 strikeouts in 42.2 innings pitched.

On March 30, 2022, it was announced that Fairbanks would miss three months of action after suffering a 50% tear of his lat muscle. Fairbanks was activated off of the injured list on July 17. In his season debut against the Baltimore Orioles, he allowed a run on two hits with two strikeouts in an inning of work. He appeared in 24 games for the Rays in 2022, logging a stellar 1.13 ERA with 38 strikeouts in 24.0 innings pitched.

On January 27, 2023, Fairbanks signed a three-year, $12 million contract extension with the Rays.

Personal life
Fairbanks's father, Shane Fairbanks, played college baseball for the Missouri Tigers in the 1980s and in minor league baseball for the Houston Astros organization in 1983.

Fairbanks and his wife, Lydia, have one son and one daughter together.

References

External links

 
Missouri Tigers bio

1993 births
Living people
Baseball players from Milwaukee
Major League Baseball pitchers
Texas Rangers players
Tampa Bay Rays players
Missouri Tigers baseball players
Hyannis Harbor Hawks players
Spokane Indians players
Hickory Crawdads players
Down East Wood Ducks players
Frisco RoughRiders players
Nashville Sounds players
Durham Bulls players